Bretton's was a high-end department store in Canada from 1985 to 1996.

The first two Bretton's stores were opened in Ottawa in 1985 by the parent company, Comark Incorporated. Comark (founded 1976), owned by the Brenninkmeijer family of the Netherlands, had owned many retail chains including Ricki's, Bootlegger, Clark Shoes, Collacut Luggage and D'Aillards. The family also owns the C&A chain of department stores in Europe.

Brettons sold clothing and cosmetics, in order to focus on high-margin, high-turn merchandise. Their stores were typically 60,000 square feet (6,000 m²), smaller than a typical department store.

Comark aimed to establish 40 to 50 branches of Bretton's, but was blocked by existing department stores who generally had clauses in their shopping centre leases allowing them to approve or reject leases to other stores

Locations
Ottawa: Rideau Centre
Ottawa: St. Laurent Shopping Centre
Toronto: Manulife Centre
Toronto: Sherway Gardens
Vaughan: The Promenade
Winnipeg: Polo Park Shopping Centre
Calgary: Chinook Centre
Calgary: Market Mall
Edmonton: West Edmonton Mall
Burnaby, B.C.: Eaton Centre Metrotown
Mississauga: Square One Shopping Centre

See also
List of Canadian department stores

References

Department stores of Canada
Defunct retail companies of Canada
Retail companies established in 1985
Canadian companies established in 1985